Christian Lloyd (born 24 January 1992) is a New Zealand rugby union player who currently plays as a lock for  in the ITM Cup and the  in Super Rugby.

Career

Lloyd was dogged with injury problems throughout the early part of his career and indeed was forced to take a 2-year sabbatical from the game to fully recover.   He returned to play 4 games for the Wellington Lions during their ill-fated 2014 ITM Cup campaign which ended in their relegation to the Championship Division.   Despite this, Lloyd was identified as a player of huge potential by the Hurricanes and was named in their squad for the 2015 Super Rugby season.

International career

Lloyd was a member of the New Zealand Under-20 team that competed in the 2012 IRB Junior World Championship in South Africa.

References

1992 births
Living people
English emigrants to New Zealand
New Zealand rugby union players
People educated at St. Patrick's College, Silverstream
Rugby union locks
Rugby union players from Poole
Victoria University of Wellington alumni
Wellington rugby union players